Timothy Mark Baillie MBE (born 11 May 1979 in Aberdeen) is a Scottish slalom canoeist who represented Britain. From Westhill in Aberdeenshire, he started competing at the international level in 1996, initially in the K1 category, but switching to C2 in 2003. He retired from the sport in 2013. He is the Olympic Champion in the C2 event from the 2012 Summer Olympics in London.

Career 
Baillie and his partner Etienne Stott won two bronze medals in the C2 team event at the ICF Canoe Slalom World Championships (2009, 2011). They also won a bronze medal in the C2 event at the 2009 European Championships at the Holme Pierrepont National Watersports Centre, Nottingham, England and came in fourth place at the 2009 ICF Canoe Slalom World Championships in La Seu d'Urgell. They won another silver and a bronze in the C2 team event at the European Championships alongside the other UK boats of David Florence/Richard Hounslow and Daniel Goddard/Colin Radmore. In 2012 they were a part of the British team that won gold at the European Championships in Augsburg in the C2 team event. They are British Premier Division Champions and British Open Champions.

At the 2012 Summer Olympics, Baillie and partner Etienne Stott qualified through the heats for the C2 event on 30 July, and subsequently progressed to the semi-final. The semi-final consisted of one run each, with the six best competitors qualifying for the final. Baillie and Stott finished in sixth place, taking the final spot and consequently qualifying for the final. As a result of their sixth-place finish, the slowest qualifying time out of the six remaining competitors, Baillie and Stott ran first in the final, securing a time of 106.41. The time was not beaten, with Baillie and Stott winning the gold medal in front of a 12,000 strong home crowd at the Lee Valley White Water Centre on 2 August. Fellow British boat of David Florence and Richard Hounslow finished second with a time of 106.77. Baillie and Stott's success was described as "unexpected" and a "surprise", with the pair describing winning gold as "mad".

Career highlights 
 2012 Summer Olympics, London - Gold Medal Men's C2
 2011 Australian Open - Penrith Whitewater Stadium - Silver Medal Men's C2
 2010 World Championships - Tacen - 17th place
 2010 European Championships - Bratislava - 4th place Men's C2 & Bronze Medal Men's Team C2
 2010 World Cup: Event 1 Prague 9th; Event 2 La Seu d'Urgell Parc Olímpic del Segre 6th, Event 3 Augsburg Eiskanal 3rd
 2009 World Championships - La Seu d’Urgell Parc Olímpic del Segre - 4th place Men's C2, Bronze Medal Men's Team C2
 2009 European Championships - Nottingham Holme Pierrepont National Watersports Centre Bronze Medal, Men's C2, Silver Medal Men's Team C2
 2009 World Cup: Overall 4th; Event 1 Pau 7th; Event 2 Bratislava 5th; Augsburg 5th

World Cup individual podiums

Personal life
He attended Westhill Academy, before studying Mechanical Engineering at the University of Nottingham.

He was appointed Member of the Order of the British Empire (MBE) in the 2013 New Year Honours for services to canoeing.

He is married to Canadian slalom canoeist Sarah Boudens.

See also
 2012 Summer Olympics and Paralympics gold post boxes

References

12 September 2009 final results for the men's C2 team slalom event for the 2009 ICF Canoe Slalom World Championships. - Retrieved 12 September 2009.

External links 

 Baillie and Stott C2 crew
 GB Canoeing - the British Canoeing Team site
 Canoe England

Scottish male canoeists
Living people
1979 births
Canoeists at the 2012 Summer Olympics
Olympic canoeists of Great Britain
Olympic gold medallists for Great Britain
Olympic medalists in canoeing
Alumni of the University of Nottingham
Members of the Order of the British Empire
Medalists at the 2012 Summer Olympics
British male canoeists
Medalists at the ICF Canoe Slalom World Championships
People educated at Westhill Academy
Sportspeople from Aberdeenshire
Scottish Olympic medallists